Knights of Asheville is a 2011 album by Tangerine Dream. It is roughly the group's 126th release.

Personnel
Edgar Froese - synthesizers, guitar

References

2011 albums
Tangerine Dream albums